The Yaroslav Mudryi National Law University  (Natsional'nyi yurydychnyi universytet imeni Yaroslava Mudroho) is a self-governing (autonomous) state higher law educational establishment of the IV level of accreditation, a national university, located in Kharkiv, Ukraine, named after Yaroslav the Wise.

History
As a separate law school, the institution was established in 1930 as Kharkiv Institute of Soviet Construction and Law. However, its heritage could be traced back to 1804 with establishment of the main city university, the Kharkiv University.

Imperial Kharkiv University

In 1835 it was officially renamed as the Law Department of the Imperial Kharkiv University.

At different times famous lawyers worked here, such as professors M.M. Alekseenko, L.E. Vladimirov, M.A. Hredeskul, V.P. Danevskyi, I.I. Ditiatin, L.N. Zahurskyi, D.I. Kachenovskyi, O.V. Kunitsin, M.O. Kuplevaskyi, O.I. Paliumbetskyi, A.M. Stoianov, M.O. Taube, I.F. Timkovskyi, M.P. Chubinskyi and others.

Institute of National Economy/Institute of Soviet Construction and Law

In 1920 by the decision of the Soviet government of Ukraine the Kharkiv Institute of National Economy was established on the basis of the Kharkiv Commercial University. The former law department of the Kharkiv Empire University was transferred to the newly created university.

It was the basis of the Law Institute which trained lawyers for state and economic bodies. The first lecturers of the law faculty – the founders of the Institute – were law professors: V.M. Hordon, V.M. Koretskyi, O.D. Kisilev, V.F. Levitskyi, M.O. Maksimeyko, M.I. Palienko, V.I. Slivitskyi, V.S. Trakhterov and others who worked at the Kharkiv University before. They were holding scientific and teaching positions for many years and made a great contribution into formation and development of law science, lawyers' education and training.

In 1930 The Institute of National Economy, taking into consideration its status of an institute of higher legal education, received a new name: the Institute of Soviet Construction and Law. In May 1933 the institute was renamed into the Ukrainian Communist Institute of Soviet Construction and Law.

Kharkiv Law Institute
In 1937 for the purpose of improvement of lawyers' training it was rearranged into the Kharkiv Law Institute of Feliks Dzerzhinsky. Throughout the history of the Institute it's rectors (directors) were P.I. Fomin, Ya.O. Sokolin, L.I. Levikov, E.O. Kustolian, K.K. Brandt, M.M. Eminnik, F.M. Tsaregradskyi, S.M. Kanarskyi, V.O. Barachtian, S.I. Vilnianskyi, O.A. Nebotov, V.P. Maslov; pro-rectors – V.M. Koretskyi, K.K. Brandt, V.V. Krivitskyi, E.O. Kustolian, G.V. Sodin, G.V. Eminnik, D.K. Piatak, M.I. Levikov, S.L. Fuks, S.I. Vilnianskyi, M.V. Hordon, A.l. Rogozhin, I.M. Danshin.

National Law Academy of Ukraine

In accordance with the resolution of Rada of Ministers of Ukraine of 20 March 1991 the Kharkiv Law Institute was rearranged into the National Law Academy of Ukraine. Under the president's decree of 30 March 1995 No. 267 the Academy was given the status of the national self-governed (autonomous) state higher educational establishment and by decree of 4 November 1995 the name of Yaroslav the Wise. In accordance with the decree of the president of Ukraine No. 457 21 May 2001 «The question of Yaroslav the Wise National Law Academy of Ukraine», recognizing its considerable role in training specialists for bodies of state authorities, law enforcement organs, various fields of law practice, considering the necessity of keeping and further development of generated scientific schools in the Academy, it was given additional rights with the approval of statute by the Cabinet of Ministers of Ukraine. In accordance with the decree of the president of Ukraine No. 485 25 May 2009 and the resolution of Cabinet of Ministers No. 796 29 July 2009, «The question of Yaroslav the Wise National Law Academy of Ukraine» the Academy was given the status of a self-governed (autonomous) scientific national higher educational establishment, which carried out their activity in accordance with its statute with the right to:

-         set up a research institute of legal science;
-         take final decisions on awarding scientific degrees and titles;
-         realize experimental educational plans and programs for training specialists for state authority bodies, organs of local government, law enforcement organs, various fields of legal practice, research and educational staff.

In accordance with the decree of the president of Ukraine #1194/2010 24 December 2010 and the resolution of Cabinet of Ministers # 2213-p of 8 December 2010, Yaroslav the Wise National Law Academy of Ukraine was renamed into National University "Yaroslav the Wise Law Academy of Ukraine".

Campuses and buildings
The main academic premise is of 22,000.00 square meters, located in Kharkiv on Pushkinska street, 77; architect O.M.Beketov built it in 1893. There are 26 departments, 8 lecture halls, sports premises and halls, 2 computer rooms, and library with reading rooms, equipped with computer networks, 2 halls of the Academic Council and the administrative units of the university.

Criminalistics Department building is of 3,000.00 square meters, located on Pushkinska street, 84; it has 3 lecture halls, 4 photo-laboratories, 2 computer labs, Internet-studio video center, museum and forensic testing ground, 
These educational buildings are architectural monuments.
The educational building located on Pushkinska street, 79/2 (2,700.00 square meters) has 5 lecture halls, classrooms, computer lab.

Premise of Crimean Law Institute with total area of 4,000.00 square meters has 4 lecture halls, lecture rooms, conference hall, library, food catering premises, hostel, sports premises, etc.

Total area of Poltava Law Institute premise is 13,917.00 square meters. There are six lecture halls, classrooms, lab for distance education, two conference rooms, two computer labs, a library, museum of criminology, 9-storied hostel of 5,607.00 square meters adjacent to main building, etc.

Currently University has premises with total area 246,611.07 square meters: 18 premises for education of 111,820.57 square meters including sports and cultural centers; 16 hostels of 113,684.00 square meters for 6861 persons; administrative buildings of 10,793.00 square meters; medical and food catering premises of 10,313.10 square meters.

Profile
The Academy has significant research and educational potential. Teaching, research and tutorial work are realized by 34 departments, employing more than 800 lecturers. Among them 100 Doctors of Law, professors, about 600 Juris Doctors, associate professors; 1 Full Member of the National Academy of Sciences of Ukraine; 15 Full Members of the National Academy of Law Sciences of Ukraine; 20 Corresponding Members of the National Academy of Law Sciences of Ukraine; 15 Honoured Science and Technology Workers; 2 Honoured Art Workers of Ukraine; 1 Honoured Higher School Worker; 15 Honoured Public Education Workers of Ukraine; 14 Honoured Lawyers of Ukraine; 1 Honoured Lawyer of Russia; 1 Honoured Builder of Ukraine; 7 Honoured Professors – Elders of the National Law Academy of Ukraine named after Yaroslav the Wise; 5 Honoured Culture Workers of Ukraine; 5 Honoured Artists of Ukraine; 10 State prize laureates.

Admissions

Research
The university carries out scientific research concerning fundamental and applied problems of jurisprudence, apparently 17 targeted complex programs are being developed on four scientific directions, famous scientific schools known in Ukraine and abroad have been formed.

Contribution
The university makes a major contribution to the perfection of a jural state in Ukraine, improvement of legislative and law enforcement processes. The university's scholars took direct participation in the development of the Constitution of Ukraine currently in force and other laws and normative legal acts, are actively influencing law enforcement practice in the country. The university cooperates with the Verkhovna Rada of Ukraine, Secretariat of the President, Cabinet of Ministers of Ukraine, ministries and departments, bodies of local government in the legislative field. Many of the university's scholars are consultants, members of consultative councils of the Supreme Court of Ukraine, Higher Economic Court, General Prosecutor's Office, Ministry of Interior Affairs, Central Electoral Commission of Ukraine and others government bodies.

Reputation
The university takes a leading position in national legal education. It is confirmed by the results of Ukrainian rating of higher educational establishments «Compass», which taking into account the rating of employers and graduates, according to which, the university is the leader among legal educational establishments of Ukraine. The university has been awarded by the Gold Medal of XIII International Exhibition of educational establishments "Modern Education in Ukraine 2010″ in the nomination «Innovations in using IT technologies in the educational process» for the innovative project «Modern architecture of informative educational environmental» (foresight-project); has taken the first prize and awarded by Diploma in the nomination of «Innovation in higher education» for the innovative project «Semantic informative educational portal of the National University "Yaroslav the Wise Law Academy of Ukraine"» in the international exhibition-presentation «Innovation in the education of Ukraine»; has taken the Grand Prize «The Leader of the higher education of Ukraine» in the international exhibition «Modern educational establishments 2010».

International relations
The university has wide international contacts. It established cooperation and signed agreements with educational establishments of Great Britain, Vietnam, Spain, Germany, Poland, Russian Federation, USA, Uzbekistan, France and other countries. It is a participant of joint European projects in the network of  «Tempus-Tasis» program and many other international projects.
On 18 September 2004 the university signed the Bologna Process.
On 14 December 2007 the university became the member of the European University Association.
On 20 November 2011 a chapter of the International Law Students Association was established on the basis of the university's international law society.

Structure

Faculty of Public Prosecutor
Dean — Marinov Vladimir Ivanovich

The Faculty of Prosecutor's Office is the largest structural unit of Yaroslav the Wise National University of Law. Its history begins with its creation in 1995. of the Training Institute for the Prosecutor's Office of Ukraine as a result of the reorganization of the Prosecutorial and Investigative Faculty No. 1 of the National Law Academy of Ukraine.

Faculty of Private Law and Entrepreneurship
Dean — Kozak Vladimir Anatolyevich

In accordance with the order of the Minister of Higher and Secondary Education of the Ukrainian SSR dated 31.05.1974, with the aim of improving the organization of the educational process and improving the quality of training of legal specialists, by order of the rector dated 03.09.1974 under No. 270, the Faculty of Investigation and Prosecutor No. 2 was established as part of the Kharkiv Law Institute. the faculty was supposed to train specialists for the prosecutor's office of the Union republics.
3 of the 1992/93 academic year, the faculty was repurposed into an economic and legal one, and the training of specialists in the specialty "Jurisprudence" began on a contract (paid) basis at the request of enterprises, institutions and other entities.
Starting from December 1, 2022, the faculty was renamed to the Faculty of Private Law and Entrepreneurship.

Faculty of Investigative and Detective Activities
Dean — Golovkin Bogdan Nikolaevich

The Faculty of Investigative and Detective Activities was created in 2021 on the basis of the reorganized Forensic Investigation Institute. The faculty is one of the most promising in the University. It introduces innovative educational activities aimed at the training of highly qualified specialists in the field of investigation, detective, investigative and forensic activities, as well as the training of legal specialists in criminal, criminal procedural and administrative legislation.

Faculty of Justice

Dean — Solyannik Konstantin Evgenievich

The Faculty of Justice of the Yaroslav the Wise National University of Law was established in accordance with the Order of the Minister of Higher and Secondary Special Education of the Ukrainian SSR in the summer of 1987 with the aim of training highly qualified legal experts for the judiciary. In August of the same year, by transferring 375 students from full-time faculty No. 1 (currently the Faculty of Prosecutor's Office), the first student body of the faculty was formed. Subsequently, the first graduation took place (1991) and for more than 30 years, more than 5,000 students have received higher education at the faculty (judges, lawyers, notaries, etc.).

The first dean in 1987 was Associate Professor of the Department of Criminal Procedure V. M. Khotynets. From 1993 to 2004, the dean of the faculty was Professor of the Department of History of the State and Law of Ukraine and Foreign Countries, Doctor of Law, Academician of the National Academy of Sciences of Ukraine, Victor Yermolaev; 2004-2009 - associate professor of the department of administrative law I. M. Kompaniets. The deputy deans at different times were: professors Y. G. Barabash, B. M. Golovkin, M. P. Kucheryavenko; doctors V.V. Vapnyarchuk, D.E. Kutomanov, D.O. Bilinskyi; associate professors S. Yu. Lukash, R. R. Tragniuk, K. E. Solyannik, V. F. Obolentsev.

In 2012, by order of the rector of the University, Faculty No. 4 was reorganized into the Institute for Training Personnel for the Judiciary of Ukraine. In 2021, the structural unit was renamed the Faculty of Justice.

At the moment, more than 1,000 students are studying full-time at the faculty by order of the state and at the expense of individuals and legal entities. In 2019, for the first time, the faculty recruited students for the 1st year of the bachelor's and master's levels of higher education by correspondence (more than 100 students). Taking into account the specifics of the future work, students of the faculty are taught special disciplines in addition to the main curriculum, in particular, "Organization of the work of justice bodies and the State judicial administration", "Organization of the work of the bar", "Free legal aid", "Theory and practice of protection of civil rights and interests", "Organization of work in court bodies", "Judicial law", "Regulatory design technique and state registration of normative legal acts", "Notary", "Executive proceedings", "Preparatory proceedings", "International civil process", "Review by courts certain categories of civil cases", "Judicial control over the execution of court decisions", "Public service", "Basics of public administration", "Administrative services in the field of justice, "Administrative procedures".

The faculty is located in the Central Building of the University (an architectural monument).

Institute for the Training of Legal Personnel for the Security Service of Ukraine
Director - Chervyakov Alexander Ivanovich (acting)

Juridical Personnel Training Institute for the Security Service of Ukraine is a military educational unit within a higher education institution that provides training for the needs of the Security Service of Ukraine for bachelor's and master's degrees in law "Knowledge" and advanced training of Security service staff. Specialist training is performed in two profiles:
Legal bases of activity of Security service of Ukraine (bachelor);
Legal Principles of State Security (Master's Degree).

Military Legal Institute
Dean — Melnyk Serhiy Mykolayovych

The Military Legal Institute began training military lawyers in 1996 as a Military Law Faculty.

The Faculty of Military Law was established by order of the rector on the basis of the Decree of the President of Ukraine dated November 20, 1996 No. 1105 "On measures to train personnel of military justice and the organization of scientific and research work in the field of military legislation" and the resolution of the Cabinet of Ministers of Ukraine dated January 22, 1998 No. 70 "On the establishment of the Military Law Faculty of the National Law Academy of Ukraine named after Yaroslav the Wise".

Faculty of International Law
Dean — Samoshchenko Igor Viktorovich

The Faculty of International Law (until March 15, 2014 - "Faculty of training lawyers for the Ministry of Foreign Affairs of Ukraine" /№7/) was founded on December 1, 1998. The faculty is currently training specialists in specialties 081 "Law" and 293 "International Law" both in full-time and part-time forms of education. The number of students reaches more than 1,000, of which 45% are studying: specialty 081 "Law" and 55% - specialty 293 "International Law".

The educational process in the specialty 081 "Law" is carried out in accordance with the curriculum of the faculty, which differs from the curricula of other faculties of the University, primarily by special disciplines in international law (history of diplomacy, law of international organizations, diplomatic and consular law, diplomatic protocol, international cooperation in fighting crime, etc.).

Faculty of Advocacy
Dean — Shekhovtsov Vladimir Vladimirovich

The Faculty of Advocacy was established on February 27, 2017. In the same year, recruitment was carried out for the first (bachelor's) and second (master's) levels of higher education. The Faculty of Advocacy trains specialists in the specialty 081 "Law" under the state funding form and at the expense of individuals and legal entities. Since 2019, recruitment has been carried out both full-time and part-time.

Poltava Law Institute
Director — Krinitsky Igor Evgenievich

The Poltava Faculty of Law was established in 2002 with the aim of providing legal personnel to Poltava and neighboring regions in accordance with the order of the Ministry of Education and Science of Ukraine No. 332 of February 28, 2001 and the order of the rector of the Yaroslav the Wise National Law Academy V.Ya. No. 43-K dated March 15, 2002. In 2010, the Poltava Faculty of Law was reorganized into the Poltava Law Institute of the Yaroslav the Wise National University of Law.

Poltava Law Institute is a separate structural unit of Yaroslav the Wise National Law University, Kharkiv.

Poltava Professional College
Director - Starostina Lyubov Leonidovna

The Poltava Vocational College of Yaroslav the Wise National Law University was created to train highly qualified specialists to meet the needs of Poltava and neighboring regions. It began its activities as the Poltava Law College of the National University of Law named after Yaroslav the Wise, which was established on December 6, 2013 by order of the Minister of Education and Science of Ukraine No. 1714. Based on the Law of Ukraine "On Vocational Pre-Higher Education" dated June 6, 2019 and the order of the Ministry of Education and Science No. 449 dated April 22, 2021, the institution changed its name to the Separate Structural Unit "Poltava Vocational College of Yaroslav the Wise National Law University", however, we consider December 6 as College Day, which is celebrated every year with significant events.

Rectors

 1930–1931 K. K. Brandt
 1931–1931 M. M. Yeminnyk
 1933–1934 S. M. Tsarehradskyi
 1934–1937 Sergey Kanarskyi
 1937–1937 L. I. Levikov
 1938–1939 Ye. O. Monastyrskyi
 1939–1941 V. O. Barakhtyan
 World War II
 1943–1948 V. O. Barakhtyan
 1948–1950 Solomon Vilnyanskyi
 1950–1962 Olexander Nebotov
 1962–1987 Vasily Maslov
 1987–2020 Vasily Tatsiy
 2020–present Anatoly Hetman

Honorable doctors and famous alumni
Vladimir M. Koretsky: head of International Law and Director of the Institute of State and Law of the USSR Academy of Sciences; graduated in 1916.
Vladimir V. Stashys: honoured professor of the National University «Yaroslav the Wise Law Academy of Ukraine», honoured professor of National University of Internal Affairs in Kyiv, honoured doctor of National University of «Kyiv-Mohyla Academy», honoured academician of International Solomon University, honoured academician of National University of Ostroh Academy, member of Russian Academy of Natural Sciences, member of Lawyers' Union of Ukraine, member of the International Association of Legal Methodology in Canada, London Academy of Diplomacy, European Association of Legislation (EAL), European Society of Criminology.
Violetta E. Konovalova: honored scientist of Ukraine (1981), winner of the prize Yaroslav the Wise, for outstanding achievements in field of science education (2001) and in nomination «For series of works on criminalistics» (2003).
Oleksandr Lavrynovych, Minister of Justice of Ukraine
Vitaliy Boiko, Minister of Justice of Ukraine, Chairman of the Supreme Court of Ukraine
Fedir Hlukh, Minister of Justice of Ukraine, Chairman of the Supreme Court of Ukraine
Vasyl Onopenko, Minister of Justice of Ukraine, Chairman of the Supreme Court of Ukraine
Petro Pylypchuk, Chairman of the Supreme Court of Ukraine

References

External links
http://jur-academy.kharkov.ua/en/about-academy
http://nauka.in.ua/en/news/education/article_detail/6300

 
Public universities
Educational institutions established in 1804
1804 establishments in Ukraine
Law schools
Law schools in Ukraine